Sacred Love is the seventh studio album by Sting. The album was released on 29 September 2003. The album featured smoother, R&B-style beats and experiments collaborating with hip-hop artist Mary J. Blige and sitar player Anoushka Shankar. Some songs like "Inside" and "Dead Man's Rope" were well received; and Sting had experimented with new sounds, in particular the more rock-influenced "This War".

Sting adapted the first quatrain of William Blake's Auguries of Innocence for the first four sung lines of "Send Your Love".

Sting's collaboration with Blige, "Whenever I Say Your Name", won the Grammy Award for Best Pop Collaboration with Vocals at the 46th Grammy Awards in 2004. The first single "Send Your Love" was also nominated for the Grammy Award for Best Male Pop Vocal Performance, but it lost to "Cry Me a River" by Justin Timberlake.

In August 2015, Mylène Farmer and Sting duetted on Stolen Car and released it as the lead single from Farmer's tenth studio album, Interstellaires; the track is produced by The Avener.

Track listing
All tracks written by Sting. All tracks produced by Sting and Kipper; co-production on "Send Your Love" by Victor Calderone, and "Never Coming Home" by BT.

Bonus tracks
There have been multiple editions of this album. Some of them, such as the Japanese edition, feature various extra songs and remixes. Although the track list on the official Sting website includes a remix of "Send Your Love" and a live version of "Shape of My Heart", these are not always available.

Depending on the edition, the following bonus tracks may be included:
"Send Your Love (Dave Audé Remix)" – 3:16
"Shape of My Heart" (Live) – 2:18
"Like a Beautiful Smile" – 4:46
"Moon over Bourbon Street (Cornelius Mix)"

Remix tracks
"Send Your Love (radio edit)" – 3:38
"Send Your Love (Calderone & Quayle radio mix)" also called "(Victor Calderone & Mac Quayle's Radio Mix)" – 4:05
"Send Your Love (Calderone & Quayle radio dub mix)" also called "(Victor Calderone & Mac Quayle's Dub Mix)" – 7:34
"Send Your Love (Calderone + Quayle future mix)" also called "(Victor Calderone & Mac Quayle's Future Mix)" – 9:50
"Send Your Love (Dave Aude remix - vocal edit)" – 3:17
"Send Your Love (Dave Aude's Extended Vocal Mix)" – 6:34
"Send Your Love (Minge Binge electric mix)" – 7:34
"Send Your Love (Dave Aude' Massive Dub)" – 8:12
"Send Your Love (Minge Binge Sex & Music Dub)" – 6:32
"Send Your Love (Josh Wink Deeper Vocal Interpretation)" – 9:01
"Send Your Love (Josh Wink Minimal Interpretation)" – 8:44
"Whenever I Say Your Name (radio edit)" – 3:41
"Whenever I Say Your Name (radio edit 1)" – 4:02
"Whenever I Say Your Name (will.i.am remix featuring Black Eyed Peas)" – 4:02
"Whenever I Say Your Name (Salaam's Groove Mix)"
"Whenever I Say Your Name (Billy Mann mix)"
"Stolen Car (Take Me Dancing) (Radio Version)" – 3:40
"Stolen Car (Take Me Dancing) (remix featuring will.i.am from The Black Eyed Peas)" – 4:05
"Stolen Car (Take Me Dancing) (B. Recluse Remix featuring Twista)" – 3:03
"Stolen Car (Take Me Dancing) (B. Recluse mix instrumental)"
"Stolen Car (Take Me Dancing) (Dave Aude's Extended Vocal Mix)" – 7:26
"Stolen Car (Take Me Dancing) (Dave Aude's Vocal Edit)" – 4:05
"Stolen Car (Take Me Dancing) (Richard "Humpty" Vission Big Floor Funk Mix)" – 6:28
"Stolen Car (Take Me Dancing) (Dave Aude's Funk Dub Mix)" – 7:29
"Stolen Car (Take Me Dancing) (Dave Aude's Haunting Dub Mix)" – 8:40
"Stolen Car (Take Me Dancing) (Richard "Humpty" Vission Acidic Groove Mix)" – 6:13
"Moon over Bourbon Street (Cornelius mix instrumental)"

Personnel 
 Sting – vocals, keyboards, guitars, bass (1-10, 12), Turkish clarinet
 Dominic Miller – guitars
 Vicente Amigo – flamenco guitar (2)
 Anoushka Shankar – sitar (9)
 Danny Dunlap – bass (11)
 Christian McBride – double bass
 Jacqueline Thomas – cello
 Kipper – keyboards, programming, backing vocals 
 David Hartley – piano and choir arrangements 
 Jason Rebello – acoustic piano, Rhodes piano
 Jeff Young – Hammond organ
 Manu Katché – drums
 Vinnie Colaiuta – drums
 Rhani Krija – percussion
 Valerie Denys – castanets
 Aref Durvesh – tabla
 Levon Minassian – duduk
 Clark Gayton – trombone
 Chris Botti – trumpet
 Mary J. Blige – lead vocals (3)
 Katreese Barnes – backing vocals
 Ada Dyer – backing vocals
 Lance Ellington – backing vocals 
 Donna Gardier – backing vocals
 Joy Rose – featured and backing vocals
 Bahija Rhapl – ethnic vocals
 Choeur de Radio France – choir
 Philip White – associate chorus master

Technical credits 
 Simon Osborne – recording, mixing
 Steve Miller – mix engineer (11)
 Peter "Hopps" Lorimer – assistant engineer 
 Donal Hodgson – Pro Tools engineer and programming 
 Claudius Mittendorfer – technical assistant
 Charlie Paakkari – technical assistant
 Rodolphe Plisson – technical assistant
 Dave Audé – remixing and additional production (11)
 Chris Blair – stereo mastering 
 Peter Mew – 5.1 mastering 
 Danny Quatrochi – personal technician
 Recorded at Studio Mega (Paris, France); The Hit Factory (New York City, New York); Capitol Studios (Hollywood, California).
 Mastered at Abbey Road Studios (London, UK).

Production credits 
 Martin Kierszenbaum – A&R 
 Andrea Ruffalo – A&R coordinator 
 Tam Fairgrieve – production manager 
 Richard Frankel – package design 
 Paolo Roversi – photography 
 Kathryn Schenker – management

Charts

Weekly charts

Year-end charts

Certifications and sales

References

External links

Sting (musician) albums
2003 albums
A&M Records albums
Albums produced by Kipper (musician)
Albums recorded at Capitol Studios